Larissa Manoela Taques Elias Santos (born 28 December 2000) is a Brazilian actress, singer, model, writer, voice actress and businesswoman. She is best known for playing Maria Joaquina in Carrossel, the twins Isabela and Manuela in Cúmplices de um Resgate and Mirela in As Aventuras de Poliana, SBT. In 2022, she made her debut on TV Globo in the soap opera Além da Ilusão, where she played Elisa and Isadora, two sisters at different stages.

Career
Larissa Manoela started her career at four, when a talent scout found her in a supermarket in the city of Guarapuava, Paraná. She started shooting as a model after she was scouted.

At six years of age, after acting in some commercials, her first television work as an actress was on the GNT channel, on the series "Mother".

In 2010, Manoela starred as the protagonist of the series Songs of Betrayal, however, she came to recognition as an actress in 2012 when she played Viviane in the telenovela Corações Feridos and Maria Joaquina in the children's telenovela Carrossel.

In 2013, she starred in the series Patrulha Salvadora, and the following year, she appeared in the soap opera Cúmplices de um Resgate, starring as the twin sisters Isabela and Manuela.

In 2016, she released her first book, "The Diary of Larissa Manoela". The book was released on June 6 at a Saraiva bookstore in a shopping mall in São Paulo. In 2017 she renewed her contract with the TV station SBT to be the character Mirela in the telenovela As Aventuras de Poliana, where she stars alongside João Guilherme Ávila. In 2017, Larissa released her second book, called "The World of Larissa Manoela". In the same year, she released her first film as a main character and bought a mansion in Orlando, Florida.

As a singer, Manoela has already done a show in the US and has done many in Brazil. On December 1, 2017, Manoela released her first live studio album called Up! Tour.

In 2020, she debuted in her first film on Netflix, called Airplane Mode, where she is a social media influencer.

Filmography

Television

Film

Voiceovers

Internet

Discography
 Com Você (2014)
 Além do Tempo (2019)
 Larissa Manoela A Milhão  (2022)

Literature

References

External links 

 
 
 
 Larissa Manoela on Instagram
 Larissa Manoela on TikTok

2000 births
Living people
21st-century Brazilian actresses
21st-century Brazilian singers
21st-century Brazilian women singers
People from Guarapuava
Brazilian film actresses
Brazilian television actresses
Brazilian child actresses